Willy Cheruiyot Kipkirui (born 24 August 1974), also known as William Cheruiyot,  is a long-distance runner from Kenya, who won the Eindhoven Marathon a record four times, in 2000, 2002, 2003 and 2004. He ran his personal best (2:08:48) on 21 May 2000 at the Vienna Marathon.

Achievements

External links
  (October 2005 – September 2006)
  (February 2000 – January 2005)
 Willy Cheruiyot at MarathonInfo
 2000 Marathon Year Ranking at ARRS

1974 births
Living people
Kenyan male long-distance runners
Place of birth missing (living people)
Kenyan male marathon runners